Marmoricola is a Gram-positive and chemoorganotrophic bacterial genus from the family of Nocardioidaceae.

References

Propionibacteriales
Bacteria genera